WEYW-LP, virtual and UHF digital channel 19, is a low-powered Action Channel-affiliated television station licensed to Key West, Florida, United States. Owned by the Bellizzi Broadcasting Network, its studio and transmitter site is near the corner of 5th Street and MacDonald Avenue in Stock Island, in addition to a satellite studio in North Miami.

WEYW is also seen on cable on Comcast channel 87 in Monroe County and AT&T U-Verse channel 19 in Miami-Dade, Broward and Monroe Counties.

In addition to Tuff TV programming, WEYW broadcasts approximately 22 hours per week of locally produced programming, such as boating and fishing shows, spear diving, cooking and local entertainment, plus a local news and information program.

The station began broadcasting over the air in 2008 as a 24-hour weather station owned by New Colonial Broadcasting. The station was purchased by Bellizzi in 2010.

External links

Television channels and stations established in 2008
EYW-LP
Low-power television stations in the United States
2008 establishments in Florida